Yellow Dwarf  is a 2001 Russian comedy film directed by Dmitry Astrakhan.

Plot 
The film tells about the love of a saleswoman and a guy from the family of a famous writer, whose parents will do everything possible to prevent a wedding.

Cast 
 Aleksandr Abdulov as Vladimir Zharovsky
 Elena Proklova as Lida Zharovskaya
 Igor Bochkin as Mikhail Semyonov
 Anna Legchilova as Vika,  Kolya's girlfriend 
 Larisa Boruchko as Galya (Vladimir's mistress)
 Elena Biryukova	as Ira	
 Mikhail Parygin as  Kolya Zharovsky
 Regina Dombrovskaya as 	episode
 Andrey Dushechkin as episode
 Tamara Muzhenko as episode

References

External links 
 

2001 films
2000s Russian-language films
2001 romantic comedy-drama films
2001 comedy films
Films directed by Dmitry Astrakhan
Russian romantic comedy-drama films